P. Sai Suresh is an Indian film editor, who has worked on Tamil language films. He regularly collaborated in ventures directed by Sundar C in the 1990s and 2000s, notably working on projects including Arunachalam (1997), Suyamvaram (1999) and Anbe Sivam (2003).

Career
Sai Suresh has edited over a hundred films, and in 1999 he notably won the Tamil Nadu State Film Award for Best Editor for his work on Unakkaga Ellam Unakkaga (1999). Often collaborating with director Sundar C, Sai Suresh was amongst the most prolific editors in terms of numbers in the 1990s, often working on action, village and comedy films in medium budget productions.

In 2012, he worked on his 80th film, the romantic comedy Ishtam starring Vimal.

Selected filmography

Tamil

 Sevagan (1992)
 Prathap (1993)
 Jai Hind (1994)
 Sarigamapadani (1994)
 Watchman Vadivel (1994)
 Maaman Magal (1995)
 Pullakuttikaran (1995)
 Villadhi Villain (1995)
 Mettukudi (1996)
 Janakiraman (1997)
 Arunachalam (1997)
 Periya Idathu Mappillai (1997)
 Periya Manushan (1997)
 Naam Iruvar Namakku Iruvar (1998)
 Thaayin Manikodi (1998)
 Suyamvaram (1999)
 Unakkaga Ellam Unakkaga (1999)
 Azhagarsamy (1999)
 Unnai Thedi (1999)
 Kannan Varuvaan (2000)
 Ullam Kollai Poguthae (2001)
 Rishi (2001)
 Azhagana Naatkal (2001)
 Vedham (2001)
 Pesadha Kannum Pesume (2002)
 Ezhumalai (2002)
 Anbe Sivam (2003)
 Winner (2003)
 Parasuram (2003)
 Ottran (2003)
 Giri (2004)
 Shock (2004)
 London (2005)
 Madrasi (2006)
 Thoothukudi (2006)
 Vanakkam Thalaiva (2006)
 Vathiyar (2006)
 Thiru Ranga/Julayi (2007)
 18 Vayasu Puyale (2007)
 Thozha (2008)
 Karthik Anitha (2009)
 Madurai Sambavam (2009)
 Agam Puram (2010)
 Maharaja (2011)
 Vikadakavi (2011)
 Ishtam (2012)
 Meeravudan Krishna (2012)
 Kadhale Ennai Kadhali (2013)
 Onbadhule Guru (2013)
 Iru Kadhal Oru Kadhai (2015)
 Kurangu Kaila Poo Maalai (2015)
 Muthuramalingam (2017)
 Munthal (2018)
 Oviyavai Vitta Yaru (2018)
 Vilambaram (2019)
 Ganesha Meendum Santhipom (2019)

Other Languages
Kannada
 Jeeva (2009)
 Gokula Krishna (2012)
 Parijatha (2012)
Malayalam
 Yugapurushan (2010)
Lucky Darbar (2011)
Kappiri Thuruthu (2016)

References

External links

Living people
Tamil film editors
Film editors from Kerala
Artists from Thiruvananthapuram
1964 births